In Christianity, annihilationism (also known as extinctionism or destructionism) is the belief that after the Last Judgment, all unsaved human beings, all fallen angels (all of the damned) and Satan himself will be totally destroyed so as to not exist, or that their consciousness will be extinguished rather than suffering everlasting torment in Hell (often synonymized with the lake of fire). Annihilationism stands in contrast to both belief in eternal torture and suffering in the lake of fire and the belief that everyone will be saved (universal reconciliation or simply "universalism").

Annihilationism is directly related to the doctrine of Christian conditionalism, the idea that a human soul is not immortal unless it is given eternal life. Annihilationism asserts that God will eventually destroy the wicked, leaving only the righteous to live on in immortality. Thus those who do not repent of their sins are eternally destroyed because of the inherent incompatibility of sin with God's holy character. Seventh-day Adventists posit that living in eternal hell is a false doctrine of pagan origin, as the wicked will perish in the lake of fire. Jehovah's Witnesses believe that there can be no punishment after death because the dead cease to exist. 

The belief in annihilationism has appeared throughout Christian history and was defended by several Church Fathers, but it has often been in the minority. It experienced a resurgence in the 1980s when several prominent theologians including John Stott were prepared to argue that it could be held sincerely as a legitimate interpretation of biblical texts by those who give supreme authority to scripture. Earlier in the 20th century, some theologians at the University of Cambridge including Basil Atkinson supported the belief. Twentieth-century English theologians who favor annihilation include Bishop Charles Gore (1916), William Temple, 98th Archbishop of Canterbury (1924); Oliver Chase Quick, Chaplain to the Archbishop of Canterbury (1933), Ulrich Ernst Simon (1964), and G. B. Caird (1966).

Some Christian denominations that are annihilationist were influenced by the Millerite/Adventist movement of the mid-19th century. These include the Seventh-day Adventists, Bible Students, Christadelphians and various Advent Christian churches. Additionally, some Protestant and Anglican writers have also proposed annihilationist doctrines. The Church of England's Doctrine Commission reported in 1995 that Hell may be a state of "total non-being", not eternal torment.

Annihilationists base the doctrine on their exegesis of scripture, some early church writing, historical criticism of the doctrine of Hell, and the concept of God as too loving to torment his creations forever. They claim that the popular conceptions of Hell stem from Jewish speculation during the intertestamental period, belief in an immortal soul which originated in Greek philosophy and influenced Christian theologians, and also graphic and imaginative medieval art and poetry.

History

Bible references
Proponents of annihilationism agree that the Bible teaches that the wicked are punished eternally, but they believe that punishment is complete destruction for eternity as opposed to eternal life in torment. They see Old Testament passages referring to the finality of judgment, and not its duration (see Isaiah 66:24; cf. 2 Kings 22:17; Isaiah 17:2–7; 51:8; Jeremiah 4:4; 7:20; 21:12; Ezekiel 20:47–48; Malachi 4:1-3).  Similarly, the New Testament teaches that the wicked will justly suffer for their sins, but the end result will be their destruction (cf. Luke 16:19–31; Romans 2:8; 2 Thessalonians 1:6).

Other New Testament texts, including Matthew 10:28, where Christ speaks of the wicked being destroyed "both body and soul" in fiery hell, John 11:11 "our friend Lazarus has fallen asleep", 1 Thessalonians 4:15 "we shall not precede those who have fallen asleep" and John 3:36 "he that believeth not the Son shall not see life".

Church Fathers and later 

Christian writers from Tertullian to Luther have held to traditional notions of Hell. However, the annihilationist position is not without some historical precedent. Early forms of annihilationism or conditional immortality are claimed to be found in the writings of Ignatius of Antioch (d. 108/140), Justin Martyr (d. 165), and Irenaeus (d. 202), among others. However, the teachings of Arnobius (d. 330) are often interpreted as the first to defend annihilationism explicitly. One quote in particular stands out in Arnobius' second book of Against the Heathen:

Eternal Hell/torment has been "the semiofficial position of the church since approximately the sixth century", according to Pinnock.

Additionally, at least one of John Wesley's recorded sermons is often reluctantly understood as implying annihilationism. Contrarily, the denominations of Methodism which arose through his influence typically do not agree with annihilationism.

Roman Catholicism
Much as certain Church Fathers and Catholic theologians have advocated qualified forms of universalism, some Catholic theologians have advocated qualified forms of annihilationism as being in line with Catholic teaching. Concerning the typical doctrinal presentation of Hell, the Catechism of the Catholic Church, 2nd Edition, states:

Anglicanism
Although the Church of England has through most of its history been closer to John Calvin's doctrine of conscious continuation of the immortal soul, rather than Martin Luther's "soul sleep", the doctrine of annihilation of the "wicked" following a judgment day at a literal return of Christ has had a following in the Anglican Communion. In 1945 a report by the Archbishops' Commission on Evangelism, Towards the conversion of England, caused controversy with statements including that "Judgment is the ultimate separation of the evil from the good, with the consequent destruction of all that opposes itself to God's will."

Millerite and Adventist movement
Recently the doctrine has been most often associated with groups descended from or with influences from the Millerite movement of the mid-19th century. These include the Seventh-day Adventist Church, the Church of God (7th day) - Salem Conference, the Bible Students, Jehovah's Witnesses, the Christadelphians, the followers of Herbert Armstrong, and the various Advent Christian churches. (The Millerite movement consisted of 50,000 to 100,000 people in the United States who eagerly expected the soon return of Jesus, and originated around William Miller).

George Storrs introduced the belief to the Millerites. He had been a Methodist minister and antislavery advocate. He was introduced to annihilationism when in 1837 he read a pamphlet by Henry Grew. He published tracts in 1841 and 1842 arguing for conditionalism and annihilation. He became a Millerite, and started the Bible Examiner in 1843 to promote these doctrines. However most leaders of the movement rejected these beliefs, other than Charles Fitch who accepted conditionalism. Still, in 1844 the movement officially decided these issues were not essential points of belief.

The Millerites expected Jesus to return around 1843 or 1844, based on Bible texts including Daniel 8:14, and one Hebrew calendar. When the most expected date of Jesus' return (October 22, 1844) passed uneventfully, the "Great Disappointment" resulted. Followers met in 1845 to discuss the future direction of the movement, and were henceforth known as "Adventists". However, they split on the issues of conditionalism and annihilation. The dominant group, which published the Advent Herald, adopted the traditional position of the immortal soul, and became the American Evangelical Adventist Conference. On the other hand, groups behind the Bible Advocate and Second Advent Watchman adopted conditionalism. Later, the main advocate of conditionalism became the World's Crisis publication, which started in the early 1850s, and played a key part in the origin of the Advent Christian Church. Storrs came to believe the wicked would never be resurrected. He and like-minded others formed the Life and Advent Union in 1863.

Seventh-day Adventist Church

The Seventh-day Adventist Church view of Hell is held to be as annihilation rather than eternal burning of the wicked, and it is one of its distinctive tenets. They hold that the wicked will be lost eternally as they are consumed in the lake of fire rather than an eternal suffering, and they will perish and cease to exist in the fire. The church formed from a small group of Millerite Adventists who kept the Saturday Sabbath and today forms the most prominent "Adventist" group.

Ellen G. White rejected the immortal soul concept in 1843. Her husband James White, along with Joseph Bates, formerly belonged to the conditionalist Christian Connection, and hinted at this belief in early publications. Together, the three constitute the primary founders of this denomination.

Articles appeared in the primary magazine of the movement in the 1850s, and two books were published. Annihilationism was apparently established in the church by the middle of that decade. (In the 1860s, the group adopted the name "Seventh-day Adventist" and organized more formally.) D. M. Canright and Uriah Smith produced later books.

A publication with noticeable impact in the wider Christian world was The Conditionalist Faith of our Fathers (2 vols, 1965–1966) by Le Roy Froom. It has been described as "a classic defense of conditionalism" by Clark Pinnock. It is a lengthy historical work, documenting the supporters throughout history.

Robert Brinsmead, an Australian and former Seventh-day Adventist best known for his Present Truth Magazine, originally sponsored Edward Fudge to write The Fire that Consumes.

Samuele Bacchiocchi, best known for his study From Sabbath to Sunday, has defended annihilation. Pinnock wrote the foreword.

The Seventh-day Adventist Church's official beliefs support annihilation. They hold that the doctrine of Hell as defined by mainstream Christianity is incompatible with the concept that God is love. They believe that God loves humans unconditionally, and has no destructive intentions for human beings. Seventh-day Adventists believe that the destructive force of Gehenna is eternal, rather than an indication of eternal conscious torment.

Church of God (7th day) – Salem Conference 
According to the Church of God (7th day) – Salem Conference, the dead are unconscious in their graves and immortality is conditional. when God formed Adam, out of the dust of the ground, and before Adam could live, God breathed the breath of life into his body: "And man became a living soul" (Genesis 2:7). See also Ezekiel 18:4, 20. Psalm 146:4 says, "His (man's) breath goeth forth, he returneth to his earth (dust); in that very day his thoughts perish." No man has ascended to heaven except Jesus Christ (John 3:13).

Others 
Other supporters have included Charles Frederic Hudson (1860), Edward White (1878), Emmanuel Petavel-Olliff (1836–1910, in 1889) and others. Early Pentecostal pioneer Charles Fox Parham taught annihilationism.

1900s onwards 
Annihilationism seems to be gaining as a legitimate minority opinion within modern, conservative Protestant theology since the 1960s, and particularly since the 1980s. It has found support and acceptance among some British evangelicals, although it is viewed with greater suspicion by their American counterparts. Recently, a handful of evangelical theologians, including the prominent evangelical Anglican author John Stott, have offered at least tentative support for the doctrine, touching off a heated debate within mainstream evangelical Christianity.

The subject really gained attention in the late 1980s, from publications by two evangelical Anglicans, John Stott and Philip Hughes. Stott advocated annihilationism in the 1988 book Essentials: A Liberal–Evangelical Dialogue with liberal David Edwards, the first time he publicly did so. However 5 years later he said that he had been an annihilationist for around fifty years. Stott wrote, "Well, emotionally, I find the concept intolerable and do not understand how people can live with it without either cauterising their feelings or cracking under the strain." Yet he considers emotions unreliable and affords supreme authority to the Bible. Stott supports annihilation, yet he cautions, "I do not dogmatise about the position to which I have come. I hold it tentatively... I believe that the ultimate annihilation of the wicked should at least be accepted as a legitimate, biblically founded alternative to their eternal conscious torment." Philip Hughes published The True Image in 1989, which has been called "[o]ne of the most significant books" in the debate. A portion deals with this issue in particular.

John Wenham's 1974 book The Goodness of God contained a chapter that challenged the traditional church doctrine, and it was the first book from an evangelical publishing house to do so. It was republished later as The Enigma of Evil. He contributed a chapter on conditionalism in the 1992 book Universalism and the Doctrine of Hell. He later published Facing Hell: An Autobiography 1913–1996, which explores the doctrine through an autobiographical approach. His interest in the topic stemmed from the 1930s as a student at the University of Cambridge, where he was influenced by Basil Atkinson. (Wenham is best known for his The Elements of New Testament Greek, which has been a standard textbook for students). He wrote:

The Fire that Consumes was published in 1982 by Edward Fudge of the Churches of Christ. It was described as "the best book" by Clark Pinnock, as of a decade later. John Gerstner called it "the ablest critique of hell by a believer in the inspiration of the Bible." Clark Pinnock of McMaster Divinity College has defended annihilation. Earlier, Atkinson had self-published the book Life and Immortality. Theologians from Cambridge have been influential in supporting the annihilationist position, particularly Atkinson.

Annihilationism is also the belief of some liberal Christians within mainstream denominations.

There have been individual supporters earlier. Pentecostal healing evangelist William Branham promoted annihilationism in the last few years before his death in 1965.

The Church of England's Doctrine Commission reported in February 1995 that Hell is not eternal torment. The report, entitled "The Mystery of Salvation" states, "Christians have professed appalling theologies which made God into a sadistic monster. ... Hell is not eternal torment, but it is the final and irrevocable choosing of that which is opposed to God so completely and so absolutely that the only end is total non-being." The British Evangelical Alliance ACUTE report (published in 2000) states the doctrine is a "significant minority evangelical view" that has "grown within evangelicalism in recent years". A 2011 study of British evangelicals showed 19% disagreed a little or a lot with eternal conscious torment, and 31% were unsure.

Several evangelical reactions to annihilationism were published. Another critique was by Paul Helm in 1989. In 1990, J. I. Packer delivered several lectures supporting the traditional doctrine of eternal suffering. The reluctance of many evangelicals is illustrated by the fact that proponents of annihilationism have had trouble publishing their doctrines with evangelical publishing houses, with Wenham's 1973 book being the first.

Some well respected authors have remained neutral. F. F. Bruce wrote, "annihilation is certainly an acceptable interpretation of the relevant New Testament passages ... For myself, I remain agnostic." Comparatively, C. S. Lewis did not systematize his own beliefs. He rejected traditional pictures of the "tortures" of hell, as in The Great Divorce where he pictured it as a drab "grey town". Yet in The Problem of Pain, "Lewis sounds much like an annihilationist." He wrote:

The Catechism of the Catholic Church (1992) describes Hell as "eternal death" (para 1861) and elsewhere states that "the chief punishment of hell is that of eternal separation from God" (para 1035). The question is what "eternal" means in this context. Thomas Aquinas, following Boethius, states that "eternity is the full, perfect and simultaneous possession of unending life" (Summa Theologica I, question 10), so apparently eternal separation from God is a "negative eternity", a complete and permanent separation from God. In the Collect (opening prayer) for the eighth Sunday after Pentecost in the Tridentine missal, we find the words "qui sine te esse non possumus", meaning "we who without Thee cannot be (or exist)".

With this one may compare the Anglican prayer-book, as the collect for the ninth Sunday after Trinity, but stating "we who cannot do anything that is good without Thee". In the modern ordinary form of the Mass of the Catholic Church, in the collect is included again, used on Thursday in the first week of Lent.

Conditional immortality 

The doctrine is often, although not always, bound up with the notion of "conditional immortality", a belief that the soul is not innately immortal. They are related yet distinct.  God, who alone is immortal, passes on the gift of immortality to the righteous, who will live forever in Heaven or on an idyllic Earth or World to Come, while the wicked will ultimately face a second death.

Those who describe or believe in this doctrine may not use "annihilationist" to define the belief, and the terms "mortalist" and "conditionalist" are often used. Edward Fudge (1982) uses "annihilationist" to refer to both the "mortalists" and "conditionalists" who believe in a universal resurrection, as well as those groups which hold that not all the wicked will rise to face the New Testament's "resurrection of the dead, both of the just and unjust".

Justifications

Interpretation of scripture
Some annihilationists insist that words like "destroy, destruction, perish, death" must refer to "non-existence". While this interpretation of those terms does not imply the non-existence of Hades or the lake of fire, this interpretation does require that the suffering of the souls that inhabit it, is terminated by their reduction to non-existence. Adventists, and perhaps others, then understand the term "Hell" (Hades or lake of fire) to refer to the process of destruction, not a permanently existing process.

Some annihilationists understand there will be suffering in the death process, but ultimately the wages of sin is death, not eternal existence. Some affirm that Jesus taught limited conscious physical sufferings upon the guilty:

Other annihilationists, who understand that a loving God would not gratuitously cause the dead to suffer, believe this verse refers to those living through the tribulation().

The adjectives "many" and "few" in Luke 12 could not be used if eternal conscious torment was what Jesus was teaching. He would have used "heavier" and "lighter" if the duration of conscious sufferings were eternal because when the "few" stripes were over there could be no more suffering. By very definition "few" and "many" declare not unlimited (or eternal) sufferings.

Annihilationists declare eternal existence and life is a gift gotten only from believing the gospel; (John 3:16) Paul calls this gift (immortality) an integral part of the gospel message: "who hath abolished death, and hath brought life and 'immortality' to light through the gospel." (2 Timothy 1:10). If all souls are born immortal, then why is humanity encouraged to seek it by Paul?  "To them who by patient continuance in well doing 'seek' for glory and honour and immortality, eternal life:" (Romans 2:7) And also, why would Jesus offer humanity an opportunity to "live forever", if all live forever? "If any man eat of this bread, he shall live forever:" (John 6:51).

Annihilationism is based on passages that speak of the unsaved as perishing (John 3:16) or being destroyed (Matthew 10:28). Annihilationists believe that verses speaking of the second death refer to ceasing to exist. Opponents of annihilationism argue that the second death is the spiritual death (separation from God) that occurs after physical death (separation of soul and body). Annihilationists are quick to point out that spiritual death happens the moment one sins and that it is illogical to believe further separation from God can take place. In addition, annihilationists claim that complete separation from God conflicts the doctrine of omnipresence in which God is present everywhere, including Hell. Some annihilationists accept the position that Hell is a separation from God by taking the position that God sustains the life of his creations: when separated from God, one simply ceases to exist.

Cited texts
 James 4:12 "God alone, who gave the law, is the Judge. He alone has the power to save or to destroy."
 Hebrews 10:39 " But we are not like those who turn away from God to their own destruction..."
 Philippians 3:18-19 "For I have told you often before, and I say it again with tears in my eyes, that there are many whose conduct shows they are really enemies of the cross of Christ. 19 They are headed for destruction."
 Psalm 92:7 "Though the wicked sprout like weeds and evildoers flourish they will be destroyed forever."
 Psalm 37:20 "But the wicked will die... they will disappear like smoke."
 Psalm 1:6: "... For the Lord watches over the path of the godly, but the path of the wicked leads to destruction."
 Hebrews 10:26-27 NLT  "There is only the terrible expectation of God's judgment and the raging fire that will consume his enemies."
 2 Peter 3:7   "...for the day of judgment, when ungodly people will be destroyed."
 Romans 2:7 "He will give eternal life to those who keep on doing good, seeking after the glory and honor and immortality that God offers."
 Genesis 3:19  " For you were made from dust, and to dust you will return."
 Psalm 146:4   "When they breathe their last, they return to the earth, and all their plans die with them."
 Ecclesiastes 9:5  "For the living know that they shall die: but the dead know not any thing, neither have they any more a reward; for the memory of them is forgotten."
 Ezekiel 18:20  "The person who sins is the one who will die."
 2 Chronicles 28:3 " He burned incense in the Valley of the Son of Hinnom, and burned his children in the fire, according to the abominations of the nations whom the Lord had cast out before the children of Israel." (the Valley of Ben Hinnom is where the concept of Gehenna or Hell comes from)
 Jeremiah 19:5  "They have built pagan shrines to Baal, and there they burn their sons as sacrifices to Baal. I have never commanded such a horrible deed; it never even crossed my mind to command such a thing!" (the Valley of Ben Hinnom is where the concept of Gehenna or Hell comes from)
 Malachi 4:1, 4:3 "The day of judgment is coming, burning like a furnace. On that day the arrogant and the wicked will be burned up like straw. They will be consumed—roots, branches, and all...  On the day when I act, you will tread upon the wicked as if they were dust under your feet," says the Lord of Heaven's Armies."  
 Matthew 10:28 "And fear not them which kill the body, but are not able to kill the soul: but rather fear him which is able to destroy both soul and body in hell."
 John 3:16  "For God so loved the world that he gave his only Son, so that everyone who believes in him may not perish but may have eternal life."
 John 6:51 "I am the living bread that came down from heaven. Anyone who eats this bread will live forever" (the offer to live forever only makes sense if it were possible to not live forever.)
 2 Thessalonians 1:9 "They will be punished with eternal destruction, forever separated from the Lord and from his glorious power."
 Romans 6:23  "For the wages of sin is death."
 2 Peter 2:6 "and turning the cities of Sodom and Gomorrah into ashes condemned them with an overthrow, having made them an example unto those that should live ungodly"
 Revelation 20:14-15 "And death and Hades were cast into the lake of fire. This is the second death, even the lake of fire. And if any was not found written in the book of life, he was cast into the lake of fire."

John Wenham, a prominent annihilationist, has classified the New Testament texts on the fate of the dead:
 10 texts (4%) "Gehenna"
 26 (10%) to "burning up"
 59 (22%) to "destruction, perdition, utter loss or ruin"
 20 (8%) to "separation from God"
 25 (10%) to "death in its finality" or "the second death"
 108 (41%) to "unforgiven sin", where the precise consequence is not stated
 15 (6%) to "anguish"

Wenham claims that just a single verse (Revelation 14:11) sounds like eternal torment to him. This is out of a total of 264 references. Ralph Bowles argues the word order of the verse was chosen to fit a chiastic structure, and does not support eternal punishment. Opponents of annihilationism, however, say that there are in fact many bible verses supporting their view.

Opposing texts
Proponents of the traditional Christian doctrine of Hell, such as Millard Erickson, identify the following biblical texts in support of their doctrine:
  "Surely God will bring you down to everlasting ruin: He will snatch you up and pluck you from your tent; he will uproot you from the land of the living."
  "He beat back his enemies; he put them to everlasting shame."
  "The sinners in Zion are terrified; trembling grips the godless: 'Who of us can dwell with the consuming fire?  Who of us can dwell with everlasting burning?'"
  "And they will go out and look on the dead bodies of those who rebelled against me; the worms that eat them will not die, the fire that burns them will not be quenched, and they will be loathsome to all mankind."
  "I will bring on you everlasting disgrace—everlasting shame that will not be forgotten."
  "I will completely destroy them and make them an object of horror and scorn, and an everlasting ruin."
  "Multitudes who sleep in the dust of the earth will awake: some to everlasting life, others to shame and everlasting contempt."
  "... where there will be weeping and gnashing of teeth." Beings that have been destroyed do not have teeth to gnash. Beings in the process of burning up in a fire, however, do.
  "... it will be more bearable for Sodom and Gomorrah on the day of judgment.."
  "... it will be more bearable for Sodom on the day of judgment than for you"
  "It is better for you to enter life maimed or crippled than to have two hands or two feet and be thrown into eternal fire."
  "... where there will be weeping and gnashing of teeth." Same as Matt 8:12
  "Then he will say to those on his left, 'Depart from me, you who are cursed, into the eternal fire prepared for the devil and his angels.
  "And if your eye causes you to stumble, pluck it out. It is better for you to enter the kingdom of God with one eye than to have two eyes and be thrown into hell, where 'the worms that eat them do not die, and the fire is not quenched.
  "And the smoke of their torment will rise for ever and ever. There will be no rest day or night for those who worship the beast and its image, or for anyone who receives the mark of its name."
  "And the devil, who deceived them, was thrown into the lake of burning sulfur, where the beast and the false prophet had been thrown. They will be tormented day and night for ever and ever."

These Christians point to biblical references to eternal punishment, as well as eternal elements of this punishment, such as the unquenchable fire, the everlasting shame, the "worm" that never dies, and the smoke that rises forever, as consistent with the traditional doctrine of eternal, conscious torment of the non-believers or sinners in Hell. An annihilationist response is that the eternal nature of the fire, worms, and disgrace do not imply eternal conscious torment, only that the punishment has eternal consequences.

Christians who believe in universal reconciliation have also criticized annihilationism using Biblical references. Books of the Bible argued to possibly support the idea of full reconciliation include the First Epistle to the Corinthians. The sections of 1 Corinthians 15:22, "As all die in Adam, so all will be made alive in Christ", and 1 Corinthians 15:28, "God will be all in all", are cited. Verses that seem to contradict the tradition of complete damnation and come up in arguments also include Lamentations 3:31–33 (NIV), "For no one is cast off by the Lord forever. Though he brings grief, he will show compassion, so great is his unfailing love", and 1 Timothy 4:10 (NIV), "We have put our hope in the living God, who is the Savior of all people, and especially of those who believe."

Advocates

British
 John Stott
 John Wenham
 Michael Green
 Philip Edgecumbe Hughes
 Roger Forster
 Richard Bauckham
 Basil F. C. Atkinson
 Ian Howard Marshall
 Anthony Buzzard

North American
 Clark Pinnock
 Edward Fudge
 Greg Boyd
 Harold Camping
 Homer Hailey
 E. Earle Ellis
 Ellen G. White
 Charles Taze Russell
 Herbert Armstrong
 John G. Stackhouse, Jr.
 Joel B. Green
 Doug Batchelor
 Chris Date
 Glenn Peoples
 Preston Sprinkle
 Randy Folliard

Agnostics
Others have remained "agnostic", not taking a stand on the issue of hell. The two listed are also British:
 F. F. Bruce, who described himself as "agnostic" on this issue
 N. T. Wright rejects eternal torment, universalism, and apparently also annihilation; but believes those who reject God will become dehumanized, and no longer be in the image of God

Critics/opponents
 John H. Gerstner
 John Piper
 J. I. Packer
 James R. White
 Steven Anderson (pastor)
 David Pawson
 Wayne Grudem
 R. C. Sproul
 Albert Mohler
 Tim Keller
 William Lane Craig
 Millard Erickson
 Francis Chan
 Franklin Graham
 Rick Warren
 John F. MacArthur
 Mark Driscoll
 C. J. Mahaney
 Heidi Baker
 Reinhard Bonnke

See also

 Oblivion (eternal)
 Problem of Hell
 Soul death
 Ultimate fate of the universe
 Universal reconciliation ("Universalism" in a Christian context)

References

Further reading
Various doctrines about hell:
 William Crockett, ed., Four Views on Hell
 Edward Fudge and Robert Peterson, Two Views of Hell: A Biblical & Theological Dialogue. Downers Grove, Illinois: InterVarsity Press, 2000
 

Advocates of Annihilationism:

 Clark Pinnock, "The Destruction of the Finally Impenitent". Criswell Theological Review 4:2 (1990), p243–259. Reprinted in A Journal from the Radical Reformation 2:1 (Fall 1992), p4–21

Critics of Annihilationism:
 Stanley Grenz, "Directions: Is Hell Forever?" Christianity Today 42:11 (October 5, 1998), p?
 Christopher W. Morgan and Robert A. Peterson, eds., Hell Under Fire: Modern Scholarship Reinvents Eternal Punishment.
 Robert A. Peterson, Hell on Trial: The Case for Eternal Punishment.

External links

Supportive
 RethinkingHell.com Exploring evangelical conditionalism
 Afterlife.co.nz The Conditional Immortality Association of New Zealand Inc. is a non-profit organization established to promote a Biblical understanding of human nature, life, death and eternity as taught throughout Scripture.
 Jewish not Greek Shows how Biblical hermeneutics proves "annihilationism" and not the Greek philosophical belief in innate immortality.

Critical
 "Hell – Eternity of Hell" in Catholic Encyclopedia
 Evangelicals and the Annihilation of Hell – Part 1, Part 2 by Alan W. Gomes. (Note the article incorrectly states Edward Fudge is from the Adventist tradition)
 "Undying Worm, Unquenchable Fire" by Robert A. Peterson. Christianity Today 44:12 (October 23, 2000)

 
Beliefs and practices of Jehovah's Witnesses
Bible Student movement
Seventh-day Adventist theology